Christophe Maurice Robert Revault (22 March 1972 – 6 May 2021) was a French professional footballer who played as a goalkeeper. After his playing career, he was the sporting director of his former club Le Havre.

Early life
Christophe Maurice Robert Revault was born on 22 March 1972 in Paris.

Playing career

Le Havre
Revault started his career with Le Havre, playing his first Ligue 1 game for them against Paris Saint-Germain at the Parc des Princes.

Paris Saint-Germain and Rennes
Revault would return to Paris to play for Paris Saint-Germain in 1997, as a replacement for Bernard Lama, who left for West Ham United. After a relatively disappointing spell with the Parisian club, Revault was snapped up by the Rennes manager Paul Le Guen, a former teammate of his at PSG, at the end of the 1997–98 season.

Toulouse
After two successful seasons with Rennes, Revault signed for Toulouse, then also playing in Ligue 1. In 2001, Toulouse were forced to be relegated down two divisions for financial reasons, but despite this Revault stuck with the club, helping them gain two successive promotions back to the top flight, picking up an award for Ligue 2's best goalkeeper of the 2002–03 season on his way. Upon his return to the top division, he was renowned as one of the finest goalkeepers plying their trade in France, although never being picked for France's national side.

Return to Brittany
Revault stayed with Toulouse until 2006, when the new manager, Élie Baup, announced that Nicolas Douchez was his first choice for the goalkeeper's jersey, prompting a return to Stade Rennais in August 2006, where he was now the second-choice goalkeeper, snapping at the heels of young Simon Pouplin.

On 6 January 2007, Revault played his first match in the colours of Rennes since returning to the club in the Round of 32 of the Coupe de France against National side Romorantin. It proved to be a bitter-sweet experience for Revault as Rennes suffered a shocking 3–1 loss after extra time in front of their own fans at the Stade de la Route de Lorient.

Back to Le Havre
In June 2007 it was announced that Revault would leave Rennes to return to Le Havre.

Post-playing career
Revault retired from playing in 2010, but remained at Le Havre as a scout. He served as interim manager in two spells during 2012 and 2015, and served as their sporting director from December 2012 until his death in May 2021.

Death
Revault was found dead in his family home in Le Havre, France on 6 May 2021 at the age of 49. The cause of death was not disclosed.

Honours
Le Havre
Division/Ligue 2: 1990–91, 2007–08

Paris Saint-Germain
Coupe de France: 1997–98

Toulouse
Ligue 2: 2002–03

Individual
Ligue 2 UNFP Team of the Year: 2002–03, 2007–08
Ligue 2 Goalkeeper of the Year: 2008

References

External links

Christophe Revault's profile, stats & pics

1972 births
2021 deaths
Footballers from Paris
Association football goalkeepers
French footballers
Le Havre AC players
Paris Saint-Germain F.C. players
Stade Rennais F.C. players
Toulouse FC players
Ligue 1 players
Ligue 2 players
Championnat National players
Le Havre AC non-playing staff